Microglossum olivaceum (vernacular name: olive earthtongue) is a species of fungus belonging to the family Geoglossaceae.

Synonym:
 Geoglossum olivaceum Pers. (= basionym)

References

Geoglossaceae
Taxa named by Christiaan Hendrik Persoon